Stethomostus is a genus of common sawflies in the family Tenthredinidae. There are at least two described species in Stethomostus.

Species
These two species belong to the genus Stethomostus:
 Stethomostus fuliginosus (Schrank, 1781) g b
 Stethomostus funereus (Klug, 1816) g
Data sources: i = ITIS, c = Catalogue of Life, g = GBIF, b = Bugguide.net

References

Further reading

External links

 

Tenthredinidae